The 1955 All England Championships was a badminton tournament held at the Empress Hall, Earls Court, London, England, from 23–26 March 1955.

Final results

Results

Men's singles

Section 1

Section 2

Women's singles

References

All England Open Badminton Championships
All England Badminton Championships
All England Open Badminton Championships in London
All England Championships
All England Badminton Championships
All England Badminton Championships